Bij (also Romanized as Bīj; also known as Bidzh) is a village in Chukam Rural District, Khomam District, Rasht County, Gilan Province, Iran. At the 2006 census, its population was 460, in 125 families.

References 

Populated places in Rasht County